Cherish the Light Years is the second studio album from the American band Cold Cave, released on April 5, 2011 on Matador Records.

Release and reception

Cherish the Light Years was released on April 5, 2011. The album was released by Matador Records on 12" vinyl, CD, and Digital formats. iTunes features an iTunes LP digital download which features an exclusive track, lyrics, and photos.

The album currently holds a 71 out of 100 rating on Metacritic. The score was based on reviews from 26 critics with 20 of the reviews being positive, 4 mixed, and 2 negative.

In a positive review from Pitchfork, Mark Richardson writes "Cherish has the feel of a breakthrough, and Wes Eisold comes across as an artist with a vision that will resonate with a larger audience."

Michael Wheeler, writer for Drowned in Sound writes in a negative review, "What happened is the only thing I can think throughout the first few listens of Cold Cave’s second album, with every subsequent spin less an opportunity to further digest than an effort to double-check if things really are as palpably awful as they seemed the last listen around."

Track listing

Personnel

Band personnel
Wesley Eisold - vocals, synthesizer, and bass guitar
Jennifer Clavin - backing vocals (1, 2, 3, 4, 5, 6, 9) and synthesizer (8)
Guy Licata - drums and percussion (all tracks)
Sean Martin - guitar (1, 4, 5)
Matt Sweeney - bass (1)
Gillian Rivera - violin (1, 3)
Beth Meyers - viola (1, 3)
Justin Kantor - cello (1, 3)
Dominick Fernow - electronics (2, 4, 8)
Daryl Palumbo - guitar (2, 3, 7, 9), bass (2, 3, 7, 9) and synthesizer (6)
Tonie Joy - guitar (3), bass (8)
Nick Zinner - guitar (7)
Eric Beyondo - trumpet (7)

Technical personnel
Chris Coady - producer, mixing
Joe LaPorta - mastering 
Greg Morris - engineering
Daryl Palumbo - pre-production 
Kris Lapke - tracking
Wesley Eisdold - art direction, layout and design 
Dominick Fernow - art direction, layout and design
Sebastian Mlynarski - photography

References

2011 albums
Cold Cave albums
Matador Records albums